NxWorries (pronounced as "no worries") is an American music superduo consisting of recording artist Anderson .Paak and record producer Knxwledge. They are signed to Stones Throw Records and released their debut studio album, Yes Lawd!, in 2016.

History

2015–16: Formation and debut album
Knxwledge and Anderson .Paak's first song under the name NxWorries, "Suede" was released on February 10, 2015, via Stones Throw Records' SoundCloud page. The song sampled "The Bottle" by Gil Scott-Heron. The song reached more than a million SoundCloud listens and nearly as many YouTube plays.

In August of 2015, Paak and Knxwledge, billed as NxWorries, joined rappers Earl Sweatshirt and Remy Banks on Sweatshirt's Ready to Leave Now Tour. On August 25, the music video for "Suede" was released on the official Stones Throw YouTube channel while another song, "Link Up", was first broadcast on Zane Lowe's Beats 1 radio show on December 1, 2015. The duo's debut EP Link Up & Suede was then released on December 4 under Stones Throw Records. The music video for "Link Up" was released on the official Stones Throw YouTube channel on March 3, 2016, featuring cameos from comedian Eric Andre and Earl Sweatshirt.

On June 19, 2016, Paak announced that NxWorries' debut album was finished and ready to be released. The album title Yes Lawd! was confirmed on July 25, 2016. On September 19, 2016, Yes Lawd! was set for a release date of October 21, 2016, while the lead single, "Lyk Dis", was also released with a music video. The album was released a week early on October 14.

2017–present: Upcoming second album 
Besides releasing a Yes Lawd! Remixes album in 2017, and more music videos until 2018, NxWorries seemed to be on an unannounced hiatus. It was not until March 27, 2020, when Knxwledge released his 1988 album containing the track "itkanbe[sonice]" featuring vocals from Anderson .Paak, that the NxWorries name was revived. During an interview with Zane Lowe on his Apple Music show in October 2020, Paak revealed that he and Knxwledge were currently working on their upcoming second album. 

On December 2, 2020, NxWorries debuted a new song called "Where I Go" during their virtual performance on 88rising's Double Happiness Winter Wonder Festival. The song was officially released almost two years later on October 9, 2022; with a guest appearance from H.E.R., and serves as the lead single to their upcoming second album.

Discography

Studio albums

Remix albums

EPs

Singles

Music videos

References 

American musical duos
American hip hop groups